Military Medical University may refer to:

 First Military Medical University, now Southern Medical University
 Second Military Medical University
 Third Military Medical University
 Fourth Military Medical University